Inorganic chemistry deals with synthesis and behavior of inorganic and organometallic compounds. This field covers chemical compounds that are not carbon-based, which are the subjects of organic chemistry. The distinction between the two disciplines is far from absolute, as there is much overlap in the subdiscipline of organometallic chemistry. It has applications in every aspect of the chemical industry, including catalysis, materials science, pigments, surfactants, coatings, medications, fuels, and agriculture.

Key concepts
Many inorganic compounds are ionic compounds, consisting of cations and anions joined by ionic bonding.  Examples of salts (which are ionic compounds) are magnesium chloride MgCl2, which consists of magnesium cations Mg2+ and chloride anions Cl−; or sodium oxide Na2O, which consists of sodium cations Na+ and oxide anions O2−.  In any salt, the proportions of the ions are such that the electric charges cancel out, so that the bulk compound is electrically neutral. The ions are described by their oxidation state and their ease of formation can be inferred from the ionization potential (for cations) or from the electron affinity (anions) of the parent elements.

Important classes of inorganic compounds are the oxides, the carbonates, the sulfates, and the halides.  Many inorganic compounds are characterized by high melting points.  Many inorganic compounds have high melting point and ease of crystallization.  Some salts (e.g., NaCl) are very soluble in water, others (e.g., FeS) are not.

The simplest inorganic reaction is double displacement when in mixing of two salts the ions are swapped without a change in oxidation state. In redox reactions one reactant, the oxidant, lowers its oxidation state and another reactant, the reductant, has its oxidation state increased. The net result is an exchange of electrons. Electron exchange can occur indirectly as well, e.g., in batteries, a key concept in electrochemistry.

When one reactant contains hydrogen atoms, a reaction can take place by exchanging protons in acid-base chemistry. In a more general definition, any chemical species capable of binding to electron pairs is called a Lewis acid; conversely any molecule that tends to donate an electron pair is referred to as a Lewis base. As a refinement of acid-base interactions, the HSAB theory takes into account polarizability and size of ions.

Inorganic compounds are found in nature as minerals. Soil may contain iron sulfide as pyrite or calcium sulfate as gypsum. Inorganic compounds are also found multitasking as biomolecules: as electrolytes (sodium chloride), in energy storage (ATP) or in construction (the polyphosphate backbone in DNA).

The first important man-made inorganic compound was ammonium nitrate for soil fertilization through the Haber process. Inorganic compounds are synthesized for use as catalysts such as vanadium(V) oxide and titanium(III) chloride, or as reagents in organic chemistry such as lithium aluminium hydride.

Subdivisions of inorganic chemistry are organometallic chemistry, cluster chemistry and bioinorganic chemistry. These fields are active areas of research in inorganic chemistry, aimed toward new catalysts, superconductors, and therapies.

Industrial inorganic chemistry
Inorganic chemistry is a highly practical area of science.  Traditionally, the scale of a nation's economy could be evaluated by their productivity of sulfuric acid. 
The manufacturing of fertilizers, which often begins with the Haber-Bosch process, is another practical application of industrial inorganic chemistry.

Descriptive inorganic chemistry
Descriptive inorganic chemistry focuses on the classification of compounds based on their properties.  Partly the classification focuses on the position in the periodic table of the heaviest element (the element with the highest atomic weight) in the compound, partly by grouping compounds by their structural similarities.

Coordination compounds

Classical coordination compounds feature metals bound to "lone pairs" of electrons residing on the main group atoms of ligands such as H2O, NH3, Cl−, and CN−.  In modern coordination compounds almost all organic and inorganic compounds can be used as ligands.  The "metal" usually is a metal from the groups 3–13, as well as the trans-lanthanides and trans-actinides, but from a certain perspective, all chemical compounds can be described as coordination complexes.

The stereochemistry of coordination complexes can be quite rich, as hinted at by Werner's separation of two enantiomers of [Co((OH)2Co(NH3)4)3]6+, an early demonstration that chirality is not inherent to organic compounds.  A topical theme within this specialization is supramolecular coordination chemistry. 
 Examples: [Co(EDTA)]−, [Co(NH3)6]3+, TiCl4(THF)2.

Main group compounds

These species feature elements from groups I, II, III, IV, V,VI, VII, 0 (excluding hydrogen) of the periodic table.  Due to their often similar reactivity, the elements in group 3 (Sc, Y, and La) and group 12 (Zn, Cd, and Hg) are also generally included, and the lanthanides and actinides are sometimes included as well.

Main group compounds have been known since the beginnings of chemistry, e.g., elemental sulfur and the distillable white phosphorus.  Experiments on oxygen, O2, by Lavoisier and Priestley not only identified an important diatomic gas, but opened the way for describing compounds and reactions according to stoichiometric ratios.  The discovery of a practical synthesis of ammonia using iron catalysts by Carl Bosch and Fritz Haber in the early 1900s deeply impacted mankind, demonstrating the significance of inorganic chemical synthesis.
Typical main group compounds are SiO2, SnCl4, and N2O.  Many main group compounds can also be classed as "organometallic", as they contain organic groups, e.g., B(CH3)3).  Main group compounds also occur in nature, e.g., phosphate in DNA, and therefore may be classed as bioinorganic.  Conversely, organic compounds lacking (many) hydrogen ligands can be classed as "inorganic", such as the fullerenes, buckytubes and binary carbon oxides.
 Examples: tetrasulfur tetranitride S4N4, diborane B2H6, silicones, buckminsterfullerene C60.

Noble gas compounds

Noble gases are elements which have filled valence electron shells in their neutral state, and are thus stable as lone atoms.  Historically known as being inert, methods were discovered to react with them.  The trend within the group is for the larger elements to be more reactive.  Xenon and krypton are more easily ionized, and can combine with extremely electronegative elements to make fluorides and oxides and form solid ionic compounds.  Argon, neon, and helium are much less reactive, though in cosmochemistry ArH+ has been observed spectroscopically in interstellar gas.  Noble gases can also be trapped in solids while not being directly coordinated in clathrates or in endohedral fullerenes.
 Examples: xenon hexafluoride XeF6, xenon trioxide XeO3, krypton difluoride KrF2, argon fluorohydride HArF

Transition metal compounds

Compounds containing metals from group 4 to 11 are considered transition metal compounds.  Compounds with a metal from group 3 or 12 are sometimes also incorporated into this group, but also often classified as main group compounds.

Transition metal compounds show a rich coordination chemistry, varying from tetrahedral for titanium (e.g., TiCl4) to square planar for some nickel complexes to octahedral for coordination complexes of cobalt.  A range of transition metals can be found in biologically important compounds, such as iron in hemoglobin.
 Examples: iron pentacarbonyl, titanium tetrachloride, cisplatin

Organometallic compounds

                 
Usually, organometallic compounds are considered to contain the M-C-H group.  The metal (M) in these species can either be a main group element or a transition metal.  Operationally, the definition of an organometallic compound is more relaxed to include also highly lipophilic complexes such as metal carbonyls and even metal alkoxides.

Organometallic compounds are mainly considered a special category because organic ligands are often sensitive to hydrolysis or oxidation, necessitating that organometallic chemistry employs more specialized preparative methods than was traditional in Werner-type complexes.  Synthetic methodology, especially the ability to manipulate complexes in solvents of low coordinating power, enabled the exploration of very weakly coordinating ligands such as hydrocarbons, H2, and N2.  Because the ligands are petrochemicals in some sense, the area of organometallic chemistry has greatly benefited from its relevance to industry.
 Examples: Cyclopentadienyliron dicarbonyl dimer (C5H5)Fe(CO)2CH3, ferrocene Fe(C5H5)2, molybdenum hexacarbonyl Mo(CO)6, triethylborane Et3B, Tris(dibenzylideneacetone)dipalladium(0) Pd2(dba)3)

Cluster compounds

Clusters can be found in all classes of chemical compounds.  According to the commonly accepted definition, a cluster consists minimally of a triangular set of atoms that are directly bonded to each other.  But metal-metal bonded dimetallic complexes are highly relevant to the area.  Clusters occur in "pure" inorganic systems, organometallic chemistry, main group chemistry, and bioinorganic chemistry.  The distinction between very large clusters and bulk solids is increasingly blurred.  This interface is the chemical basis of nanoscience or nanotechnology and specifically arise from the study of quantum size effects in cadmium selenide clusters. Thus, large clusters can be described as an array of bound atoms intermediate in character between a molecule and a solid.
 Examples: Fe3(CO)12, B10H14, [Mo6Cl14]2−, 4Fe-4S

Bioinorganic compounds

By definition, these compounds occur in nature, but the subfield includes anthropogenic species, such as pollutants (e.g., methylmercury) and drugs (e.g., Cisplatin).  The field, which incorporates many aspects of biochemistry, includes many kinds of compounds, e.g., the phosphates in DNA, and also metal complexes containing ligands that range from biological macromolecules, commonly peptides, to ill-defined species such as humic acid, and to water (e.g., coordinated to gadolinium complexes employed for MRI).  Traditionally bioinorganic chemistry focuses on electron- and energy-transfer in proteins relevant to respiration.  Medicinal inorganic chemistry includes the study of both non-essential and essential elements with applications to diagnosis and therapies.
 Examples: hemoglobin, methylmercury, carboxypeptidase

Solid state compounds

This important area focuses on structure, bonding, and the physical properties of materials.  In practice, solid state inorganic chemistry uses techniques such as crystallography to gain an understanding of the properties that result from collective interactions between the subunits of the solid.  Included in solid state chemistry are metals and their alloys or intermetallic derivatives.  Related fields are condensed matter physics, mineralogy, and materials science.
 Examples: silicon chips, zeolites, YBa2Cu3O7

Theoretical inorganic chemistry
An alternative perspective on the area of inorganic chemistry begins with the Bohr model of the atom and, using the tools and models of theoretical chemistry and computational chemistry, expands into bonding in simple and then more complicated molecules.  Precise quantum mechanical descriptions for multielectron species, the province of inorganic chemistry, is difficult.  This challenge has spawned many semi-quantitative or semi-empirical approaches including molecular orbital theory and ligand field theory, In parallel with these theoretical descriptions, approximate methodologies are employed, including density functional theory.

Exceptions to theories, qualitative and quantitative, are extremely important in the development of the field.  For example, CuII2(OAc)4(H2O)2 is almost diamagnetic below room temperature whereas crystal field theory predicts that the molecule would have two unpaired electrons.  The disagreement between qualitative theory (paramagnetic) and observation (diamagnetic) led to the development of models for magnetic coupling, such as the exchange interaction.  These improved models led to the development of new magnetic materials and new technologies.

Qualitative theories

Inorganic chemistry has greatly benefited from qualitative theories.  Such theories are easier to learn as they require little background in quantum theory.  Within main group compounds, VSEPR theory powerfully predicts, or at least rationalizes, the structures of main group compounds, such as an explanation for why NH3 is pyramidal whereas ClF3 is T-shaped.  For the transition metals, crystal field theory allows one to understand the magnetism of many simple complexes, such as why [FeIII(CN)6]3− has only one unpaired electron, whereas [FeIII(H2O)6]3+ has five.  A particularly powerful qualitative approach to assessing the structure and reactivity begins with classifying molecules according to electron counting, focusing on the numbers of valence electrons, usually at the central atom in a molecule.

Molecular symmetry group theory

A central construct in inorganic chemistry is the theory of molecular symmetry. Mathematical group theory provides the language to describe the shapes of molecules according to their point group symmetry.  Group theory also enables factoring and simplification of theoretical calculations.

Spectroscopic features are analyzed and described with respect to the symmetry properties of the, inter alia, vibrational or electronic states. Knowledge of the symmetry properties of the ground and excited states allows one to predict the numbers and intensities of absorptions in vibrational and electronic spectra.  A classic application of group theory is the prediction of the number of C-O vibrations in substituted metal carbonyl complexes.  The most common applications of symmetry to spectroscopy involve vibrational and electronic spectra.

Group theory highlights commonalities and differences in the bonding of otherwise disparate species.  For example, the metal-based orbitals transform identically for WF6 and W(CO)6, but the energies and populations of these orbitals differ significantly.  A similar relationship exists CO2 and molecular beryllium difluoride.

Thermodynamics and inorganic chemistry
An alternative quantitative approach to inorganic chemistry focuses on energies of reactions.  This approach is highly traditional and empirical, but it is also useful.  Broad concepts that are couched in thermodynamic terms include redox potential, acidity, phase changes.  A classic concept in inorganic thermodynamics is the Born–Haber cycle, which is used for assessing the energies of elementary processes such as electron affinity, some of which cannot be observed directly.

Mechanistic inorganic chemistry
An important aspect of inorganic chemistry focuses on reaction pathways, i.e. reaction mechanisms.

Main group elements and lanthanides
The mechanisms of main group compounds of groups 13-18 are usually discussed in the context of organic chemistry (organic compounds are main group compounds, after all).  Elements heavier than C, N, O, and F often form compounds with more electrons than predicted by the octet rule, as explained in the article on hypervalent molecules.  The mechanisms of their reactions differ from organic compounds for this reason.  Elements lighter than carbon (B, Be, Li) as well as Al and Mg often form electron-deficient structures that are electronically akin to carbocations.  Such electron-deficient species tend to react via associative pathways.  The chemistry of the lanthanides mirrors many aspects of chemistry seen for aluminium.

Transition metal complexes
Transition metal and main group compounds often react differently. The important role of d-orbitals in bonding strongly influences the pathways and rates of ligand substitution and dissociation.  These themes are covered in articles on coordination chemistry and ligand.  Both associative and dissociative pathways are observed.

An overarching aspect of mechanistic transition metal chemistry is the kinetic lability of the complex illustrated by the exchange of free and bound water in the prototypical complexes [M(H2O)6]n+:
[M(H2O)6]n+  + 6 H2O*  →  [M(H2O*)6]n+  +  6 H2O
where H2O* denotes isotopically enriched water, e.g., H217O
The rates of water exchange varies by 20 orders of magnitude across the periodic table, with lanthanide complexes at one extreme and Ir(III) species being the slowest.

Redox reactions
Redox reactions are prevalent for the transition elements.  Two classes of redox reaction are considered: atom-transfer reactions, such as oxidative addition/reductive elimination, and electron-transfer.  A fundamental redox reaction is "self-exchange", which involves the degenerate reaction between an oxidant and a reductant.  For example, permanganate and its one-electron reduced relative manganate exchange one electron:
[MnO4]− +  [Mn*O4]2−  →  [MnO4]2− +  [Mn*O4]−

Reactions at ligands
Coordinated ligands display reactivity distinct from the free ligands.  For example, the acidity of the ammonia ligands in [Co(NH3)6]3+ is elevated relative to NH3 itself.  Alkenes bound to metal cations are reactive toward nucleophiles whereas alkenes normally are not.  The large and industrially important area of catalysis hinges on the ability of metals to modify the reactivity of organic ligands.  Homogeneous catalysis occurs in solution and heterogeneous catalysis occurs when gaseous or dissolved substrates interact with surfaces of solids.  Traditionally homogeneous catalysis is considered part of organometallic chemistry and heterogeneous catalysis is discussed in the context of surface science, a subfield of solid state chemistry.  But the basic inorganic chemical principles are the same.  Transition metals, almost uniquely, react with small molecules such as CO, H2, O2, and C2H4.  The industrial significance of these feedstocks drives the active area of catalysis.  Ligands can also undergo ligand transfer reactions such as transmetalation.

Characterization of inorganic compounds
Because of the diverse range of elements and the correspondingly diverse properties of the resulting derivatives, inorganic chemistry is closely associated with many methods of analysis.  Older methods tended to examine bulk properties such as the electrical conductivity of solutions, melting points, solubility, and acidity.  With the advent of quantum theory and the corresponding expansion of electronic apparatus, new tools have been introduced to probe the electronic properties of inorganic molecules and solids.  Often these measurements provide insights relevant to theoretical models. Commonly encountered techniques are:
 X-ray crystallography: This technique allows for the 3D determination of molecular structures.
 Dual polarisation interferometer: This technique measures the conformation and conformational change of molecules.
 Various forms of spectroscopy:
 Ultraviolet-visible spectroscopy: Historically, this has been an important tool, since many inorganic compounds are strongly colored
 NMR spectroscopy: Besides 1H and 13C many other NMR-active nuclei (e.g., 11B, 19F, 31P, and 195Pt) can give important information on compound properties and structure.  The NMR of paramagnetic species can provide important structural information. Proton (1H) NMR is also important because the light hydrogen nucleus is not easily detected by X-ray crystallography.
 Infrared spectroscopy: Mostly for absorptions from carbonyl ligands
 Electron nuclear double resonance (ENDOR) spectroscopy
 Mössbauer spectroscopy
 Electron-spin resonance: ESR (or EPR) allows for the measurement of the environment of paramagnetic metal centres.
 Electrochemistry: Cyclic voltammetry and related techniques probe the redox characteristics of compounds.

Synthetic inorganic chemistry
Although some inorganic species can be obtained in pure form from nature, most are synthesized in chemical plants and in the laboratory.

Inorganic synthetic methods can be classified roughly according to the volatility or solubility of the component reactants.  Soluble inorganic compounds are prepared using methods of organic synthesis.  For metal-containing compounds that are reactive toward air, Schlenk line and glove box techniques are followed. Volatile compounds and gases are manipulated in "vacuum manifolds" consisting of glass piping interconnected through valves, the entirety of which can be evacuated to 0.001 mm Hg or less. Compounds are condensed using liquid nitrogen (b.p. 78K) or other cryogens. Solids are typically prepared using tube furnaces, the reactants and products being sealed in containers, often made of fused silica (amorphous SiO2) but sometimes more specialized materials such as welded Ta tubes or Pt "boats". Products and reactants are transported between temperature zones to drive reactions.

See also
 Important publications in inorganic chemistry

References